Lyuben Sevdin (26 July 1953 – 21 September 2013) was a Bulgarian footballer. He was a defender who played from 1971 to 1985, most notably for Marek Dupnitsa.

The defining moment of his playing career came in the 1978 Bulgarian Cup Final, when he scored the winning goal for Marek against CSKA Sofia, producing one of the biggest Cup upsets. In his career he also played for Cherno More Varna, Dobrudzha Dobrich, and Germanea Sapareva Banya.

Honours

Marek Dupnitsa
 Bulgarian Cup: 1977–78

References

1953 births
2013 deaths
Bulgarian footballers
PFC Marek Dupnitsa players
PFC Cherno More Varna players
PFC Dobrudzha Dobrich players
First Professional Football League (Bulgaria) players
Association football fullbacks
People from Dupnitsa
Sportspeople from Kyustendil Province